Bridge of Time was a 1950 short film made by London Films that was nominated at the 25th Academy Awards in the category of Best Short film-2 reel. It was directed by Geoffrey Boothby and David Eady.

References

External links

1950 films
1950 short films
British short films